The Mammoth Tusk is the first album by the Lebanese-Syrian rapper Eslam Jawaad, released on 6 July 2009. It features guest collaborations by Miskeena, Lord Sear, Shadia Mansour and Rude Jude. The album also has more mainstream performers including De La Soul and Damon Albarn, the frontman of Blur, Gorillaz and The Good, the Bad & the Queen). Jawaad worked with Albarn on The Good, the Bad & the Queen's first album, The Good, the Bad & the Queen on an unreleased B-side entitled "Mr. Whippy" and also appeared with Albarn on Gorillaz's Escape to Plastic Beach World Tour when he rapped on their song "Clint Eastwood". When the group played in Damascus, he rapped in his native Arabic, as he does on the song "Alarm Chord" which also features Albarn. His song "Pivot Widdit" was used in the Dubai film City of Life.

Track listing
"Pivot Widdit" - 3:26
"Star Spangled Banner" - 3:05
"Tickle My Pickle"  (featuring Miskenna) - 3:40
"Rewind DJ"  (featuring De La Soul) - 4:37
"Baba's Shotgun" - 1:21
"Trick" - 3:10
"Leave it Alone" - 3:06
"It Wasn't Me (Skit)"  (featuring Lord Sear and Rude Jude) - 1:15
"Criminuhl" - 3:20
"Heave Ho" - 3:52
"The Mammoth Tusk" - 4:18
"Big Slingaz'" - 4:09
"So Real"  (featuring Shadia Mansour)
"Alarm Chord"  (featuring Damon Albarn) - 3:29
"Beirut" - 3:52

References

2009 albums